East Sussex Fire & Rescue Service (ESFRS) is the statutory fire and rescue service for the county of East Sussex and city of Brighton and Hove, England. It is headquartered in Lewes. The service has a total of 24 fire stations.

Performance
In 2018/2019, every fire and rescue service in England and Wales was subjected to a statutory inspection by Her Majesty's Inspectorate of Constabulary and Fire & Rescue Services (HIMCFRS). The inspection investigated how well the service performs in each of three areas. On a scale of outstanding, good, requires improvement and inadequate, East Sussex Fire and Rescue Service was rated as follows:

Fire stations 
ESFRS operates 24 fire stations that are divided into three groups: West Group, Central Group, and East Group.
The fire stations are crewed by wholetime firefighters, retained firefighters, or a combination of both.

See also
 Fire service in the United Kingdom
 Smoke detector
 List of British firefighters killed in the line of duty

Other East Sussex emergency services
 Sussex Police
 South East Coast Ambulance Service
 Brighton Lifeboat Station

References

External links

East Sussex Fire and Rescue Service at HMICFRS

Fire and rescue services of England
Fire